50th Birthday Celebration Volume 7 is a live album by Masada documenting their performance at Tonic in September 2003 as part of John Zorn's month-long 50th Birthday Celebration.

Reception
The Allmusic review awarded the album 3½ stars.

Track listing 
All compositions by John Zorn

Personnel 
Masada
 John Zorn – saxophone
 Dave Douglas – trumpet
 Greg Cohen – bass
 Joey Baron – drums

References 

Albums produced by John Zorn
Masada (band) albums
John Zorn live albums
2004 live albums
Tzadik Records live albums